The Party Alliance for Yucatán (Spanish: Alianza Partido por Yucatán, PAY) was a political party in the Mexican state of Yucatán. It was formed in the early 21st century with the aim of representing the interests of the people of Yucatán at the local and national levels. 

The party was led by Xavier Abreu Sierra, who sought the National Action Party's nomination for the position of governor of Yucatán. However, he was defeated by Yvonne Ortega-Pacheco, who ran on a coalition of the Institutional Revolutionary Party (PRI), Greens, and the local Alliance for Yucatán. Payán, who initially sought the National Action nomination but was defeated by Abreu, left the party and won the nomination of the nominally left-wing parties Convergence and the Workers Party, despite her right-wing ideology.

On May 16, the PAY received only 2,959 votes out of a total of 860,129 cast, equivalent to 0.34% of the total votes. As a result, the General Council of the Institute of Electoral Procedures and Citizen Participation (IPEPAC) cancelled the party's registration, and its assets were liquidated to cover any debts. The party was not permitted to request re-registration until after an ordinary state electoral process had taken place.

Governor

References 

Defunct political parties in Mexico